Roseli do Carmo Gustavo (born 25 July 1971 in Araraquara) is a Brazilian former basketball player who competed in the 1996 Summer Olympics.

References

1971 births
Living people
People from Araraquara
Brazilian women's basketball players
Olympic basketball players of Brazil
Basketball players at the 1996 Summer Olympics
Basketball players at the 1991 Pan American Games
Olympic silver medalists for Brazil
Olympic medalists in basketball
Medalists at the 1996 Summer Olympics
Pan American Games medalists in basketball
Pan American Games gold medalists for Brazil
Medalists at the 1991 Pan American Games
Sportspeople from São Paulo (state)
20th-century Brazilian women